Tyler Paul Smith (born July 7, 1990) is an American politician from Georgia. Smith is a Republican member of Georgia House of Representatives for District 18.

References

Republican Party members of the Georgia House of Representatives
21st-century American politicians
Living people
1990 births